Meenakshi Thapar or Meenakshi Thapa (4 October 1984 – 19 April 2012) was an Indian actress who worked in Hindi-language films. Thapar was born in Dehradun. She made her acting debut in the 2011 horror film 404.

Kidnapping and Murder 
In April 2012, during the filming of Heroine, Thapa was kidnapped by another actor who had a minor role in the film, Amit Jaiswal, and his girlfriend, Preeti Surin, who had overheard her talking of her family's wealth. She was held for a ransom of 1.5 million (approximately ). They told her mother that, if the ransom was not paid, she would be forced into pornographic films. Her mother paid 60,000 rupees. Meenakshi was later strangled and decapitated in a hotel in Gorakhpur. Her torso was left in a water tank and her head thrown out of a bus on the way to Mumbai. The perpetrators were caught with the SIM card from her mobile phone and confessed to the crime.

Aftermath 
On 9 May 2018, A sessions court in South Mumbai on Wednesday convicted two junior artistes of the 2012 abduction and murder of Meenakshi Thapar.

Additional Sessions Judge SG Shette found Amit Jaiswal, 36, and his girlfriend Preeti Surin, 26, guilty under IPC sections 302 (murder) and 364-A (kidnapping for ransom).

Mumbai Sessions Court on Friday sentenced them to life imprisonment.

"Sessions Judge S.G. Shete found them guilty on three main counts of kidnapping, extortion and murder of Thapa and sentenced them to life imprisonment," Special Public Prosecutor Ujjwal Nikam told the media.

On Wednesday, Judge Shete found Amit Kumar Jaiswal, 40, and his girlfriend Preeti Surin, 36, guilty of killing the 27-year-old actress in Uttar Pradesh in 2012.

During the arguments on the sentence, Nikam had termed the murder as "the rarest of rare cases" and demanded death sentence for both.

Filmography

Films

References

External links 
 

Indian film actresses
2012 deaths
Deaths by strangulation
Deaths by decapitation
Actresses in Hindi cinema
People murdered in Uttar Pradesh
21st-century Indian actresses
Violence against women in India
Indian actresses